HHM may refer to:
 Hamelin station, Lower Saxony, Germany
 Hungarian Hope Movement
 Hamlin, Hamlin & McGill, a fictional law firm in the TV series Better Call Saul